Xujiapeng Station, is a transfer station on Line 5, Line 7 and Line 8 of the Wuhan Metro in Wuhan, China.It entered revenue service on December 26, 2017, and is located in Wuchang District.

Station layout

Gallery

References

Wuhan Metro stations
Line 5, Wuhan Metro
Line 7, Wuhan Metro
Line 8, Wuhan Metro
Railway stations in China opened in 2017